The Klaustur Affair, also known in Iceland as Klaustur Recordings (Klaustursupptökurnar) or Klausturgate was a political affair in Iceland that sparked public debate and protests in Iceland since late November 2018. It was triggered by audio recordings of conversations between Althing Icelandic parliamentarians, which were secretly recorded on 20 November 2018 in Bar Klaustur in Reykjavík and subsequently leaked to the media. The records contain offensive and sexist statements about female members of parliament and revealing the appointment of an ambassador as a political favour.

Events 
On the evening of 20 November 2018, parliamentarian and former Prime Minister Sigmundur Davíð Gunnlaugsson from the Centre Party, his party friends Gunnar Bragi Sveinsson, Anna Kolbrún Árnadóttir and Bergþór Ólason, and Karl Gauti Hjaltason and Ólafur Ísleifsson from the People's Party made rude and sexist comments and were secretly recorded and leaked to the media.

References 

November 2018 events in Europe
2018 in Iceland
2018 in politics
Political scandals in Iceland
Politics of Iceland